Kuzminec   is a village in Croatia. It is connected by the D35 highway.

References

Populated places in Krapina-Zagorje County